This article shows the roster of all participating clubs at the 2018–19 V.League Division 1 Men's.

Panasonic Panthers
The following is Panasonic Panthers roster in the 2018–19 V.League Division 1.

Head coach:  Hiroyuki Furuta

Toyoda Gosei Trefuerza
The following is Toyoda Gosei Trefuerza roster in the 2018–19 V.League Division 1.

Head coach:  Anders Kristiansson

Toray Arrows
The following is Toray Arrows roster in the 2018–19 V.League Division 1.

Head coach:  Shinoda Ayumu

JT Thunders
The following is JT Thunders roster in the 2018–19 V.League Division 1.

Head coach:  Veselin Vuković

Suntory Sunbirds
The following is Suntory Sunbirds roster in the 2018–19 V.League Division 1.

Head coach:  Daisuke Sakai

JTEKT Stings
The following is JTEKT Stings roster in the 2018–19 V.League Division 1.

Head coach:  Tomoaki Wakayama

Osaka Blazers Sakai
The following is Osaka Blazers Sakai roster in the 2018–19 V.League Division 1.

Head coach:  Toru Uesugi

FC Tokyo
The following is FC Tokyo roster in the 2018–19 V.League Division 1.

Head coach:  Masayasu Sakamoto

References

V.League Men
V.League Men
Men's
2018 in Japanese sport
2019 in Japanese sport